Seira is a genus of slender springtails in the family Entomobryidae. There are about 17 described species in Seira.

Species
 Seira bipunctata (Packard, 1873)
 Seira brasiliana (Arlé, 1939) Marcus, 1949
 Seira dollfusi Carl, 1899
 Seira domestica (Nicolet, 1842)
 Seira dubia Christiansen & Bellinger, 1980
 Seira gobalezai Christiansen and Bellinger, 1992
 Seira incolorata Denis, 1931
 Seira knowltoni (Wray, 1953)
 Seira lelo Christiansen and Bellinger, 1992
 Seira mexicana Folsom, 1898
 Seira pihulu Christiansen and Bellinger, 1992
 Seira prope-bipunctata 
 Seira purpurea Schött, H, 1891
 Seira reinhardi (Mills, 1931)
 Seira squamoorrnata Stacherbakow, 1898
 Seira taeniata (Handschin, 1935)
 Seira terrestris (Folsom, 1932)

References

Entomobryomorpha
Springtail genera
Taxa named by John Lubbock, 1st Baron Avebury